Gabrio Piola (15 July 1794 – 9 November 1850) was an Italian mathematician and physicist, member of the  Lombardo Institute of Science, Letters and Arts. He studied in particular the mechanics of the continuous, linking his name to the tensors called Piola–Kirchhoff.

Biography
Count Gabrio Piola Daverio was born in Milan in a rich and aristocratic family. Initially he studied at home and then at the local high school. Given his exceptional ability in mathematics and physics, he started to study mathematics at the University of Pavia, as a student of Vincenzo Brunacci, obtaining his doctorate on 24 June 1816. He didn’t follow an academic career even though he was offered the chair of Applied Mathematics in Rome; he preferred dedicating himself to private teaching.

One of his students was Francesco Brioschi who became Professor of rational mechanics at Pavia and President of the Academy of High Schools.

His research activity started in 1824, winning a competition and related prize at the Lombard Institute of Milan, with a long article on the mechanics of Lagrange. His  mathematical research contributed to the calculation of the finite differences and to integral calculus, whilst in mechanics he dedicated himself to continuous mechanics  and to hydraulics.

Piola was also editor of a journal,  mathematical and physics booklets of which only two volumes were published. However this journal was the means of presenting the theories of Cauchy in Italy: in effect the journal contained some of Cauchy’s fundamental works, translated from French into Italian.

Count Piola was also a person of great culture who dedicated himself to the study of history and philosophy: amongst the fruits of his studies he wrote about Bonaventura Cavalieri.

He was a member of many scientific societies, amongst which the Italian Society of Science, and from 1825 he was part of the Roman Academy of the Catholic Religion. He was a fervent Catholic, as also was Cauchy. For the latter Piola was a reference point for his stay in Italy from 1830 to 1833. He additionally taught religion for twenty-four years in a parish in Milan and was the friend of Antonio Rosmini, at that time  the most important exponent of Catholic spirituality.

He was mainly involved in continuum mechanics, concerning fluids and solids. The Piola–Kirchhoff stress tensor and Piola transformation bear his name.

Piazzale Piola and stazione Piola in Milan are named after him. He died in Giussano della Brianza in 1850.

Writings

 Gabrio Piola, Sull'applicazione de' principj della meccanica analitica del Lagrange ai principali problemi. Memoria di Gabrio Piola presentata al concorso del premio e coronata dall'I.R. Istituto di Scienze, ecc. nella solennita del giorno 4 ottobre 1824, Milano, Imp. Regia stamperia, 1825
 Gabrio Piola, Sulla trasformazione delle formole integrali duplicate e triplicate,  Modena, Tipografia Camerale, 1828
 Gabrio Piola, Sulla teorica delle funzioni discontinue, Modena, Tipografia Camerale, 1830
 Gabrio Piola, Memoria sulla Teorica del Pendolo, Milano, Imp. Reg. Stamperia, 1831
 Gabrio Piola, Memoria sull'applicazione del calcolo delle differenze alle questioni dell'analisi indeterminata, Padova, Tip. del Seminario, 1831
 Gabrio Piola, La meccanica de' corpi naturalmente estesi: trattata col calcolo delle variazioni, Milano, Giusti, 1833
 Gabrio Piola, Nuova analisi per tutte le questioni della meccanica molecolare, Modena, Tipografia camerale, 1835
 Gabrio Piola, Nuove ricerche per una risoluzione più rigorosa di vari problemi sul moto dell'acqua: memoria, Milano, Bernardoni, 1840
 Gabrio Piola, Trattato sul calcolo degli integrali definiti: parte 1, Milano: Giusti, 1839
 Gabrio Piola, Sulla legge della permanenza delle molecole de' fluidi in moto alle superficie libere, Milano, Bernardoni, 1843
 Gabrio Piola, Sul moto permanente dell'acqua, Milano, G. Bernardoni e C., 1845
 Gabrio Piola, Memoria intorno alle equazioni fondamentali del movimento di corpi qualsivogliono considerati secondo la naturale loro forma e costituzione, Modena, Tipi del R.D. Camera, 1846
 Gabrio Piola, Di un principio controverso della Meccanica analitica di Lagrange e delle molteplici sue applicazioni (memoria postuma pubblicata per cura del prof. Francesco Brioschi), Milano, Bernardoni, 1856

Writings on line

Notes

References 
 D. Capecchi, "Gabrio Piola e la Meccanica italiana agli inizi dell'Ottocento",  Atti del XXIII Congresso Nazionale di Storia della Fisica e dell'Astronomia - Bari 5-7 giugno 2003, pp. 95–108 (at the University of Milan)
 A. Filoni, A. Giampaglia, "Gabrio Piola 1794-1850 Biografia di un matematico umanista" Città di Giussano, Bellavite, (2006).
 F. dell'Isola, G. Maier, U. Perego, U. Andreaus, R. Esposito, S. Forest, "The complete works of Gabrio Piola: Volume I - Commented English Translation". Springer, (2014)..
 F. dell'Isola, U. Andreaus U, L. Placidi, "At the origins and in the vanguard of peridynamics, non-local and higher-gradient continuum mechanics: An underestimated and still topical contribution of Gabrio Piola". Math. Mech. Solids, 20:887-928, 2015. (doi:10.1177/1081286513509811)

External links

 Gabrio Piola and Italian Mechanics by Danilo Capecchi at the University of Naples
 Gabrio Piola – scientist

19th-century Italian mathematicians
19th-century Italian physicists
1794 births
1850 deaths
Scientists from Milan
University of Pavia alumni